Born Wild is a 2001 Hong Kong action drama film directed by Patrick Leung and starring Louis Koo, Daniel Wu, Patrick Tam and Jo Kuk.

Plot
Tan (Louis Koo) and Tide Ho (Daniel Wu) are estranged twin brothers who have fought ever since they were born. Tan was a bright child who was active and outgoing while Tide is the complete opposite, whom was shy and introverted. But in reality, Tide was actually just as bright as Tan but kept it to himself. On his twenty-sixth birthday, Tide receives the news of his brother's death. He then proceeds to investigate Tan's mysterious death. In Tan's house, Tide meets his brother's lover Sandy (Jo Kuk) and best friend Mann (Patrick Tam). Tide eventually discovers that his brother was framed in a boxing fight and was killed during a fight. At the same time, Tide finds himself attracted to Sandy's warmth and fixes himself as the opponent of Tan's murderer and avenge his brother's death.

Cast

Award nomination
21st Hong Kong Film Awards
Nominated: Best Supporting Actor (Patrick Tam)

Reception

Critical
John Charles, associate editor and film reviewer for Video Watchdog magazine, gave the film four stars out of ten on the website Hong Kong Digital and a negative review citing its tediously overstylized combat sequences, hanging plot threads, and its ludicrous climax.

Love HK Film gave a mixed review writing it as "Well made with some fine performances (Patrick Tam and Jo Kuk), the film also suffers from mind-numbing existentialism and an emotionally-bereft payoff. Smaller parts of Born Wild make it worth seeing, but the whole is questionably above average."

Box office
The film grossed HK$1,294,585 at the Hong Kong box office during its run from 31 May to 27 June 2001 in Hong Kong.

References

External links

Born Wild at Hong Kong Cinemagic

2001 films
2001 martial arts films
Hong Kong action drama films
Hong Kong martial arts films
Hong Kong boxing films
Underground fighting films
Martial arts tournament films
2000s Cantonese-language films
Sports fiction
China Star Entertainment Group films
Hong Kong films about revenge
Films set in Hong Kong
Films shot in Hong Kong
2001 action drama films
2000s Hong Kong films